Another Green World is the third studio album by English musician Brian Eno (credited simply as "Eno"), released by Island Records in November 1975. Produced by Eno and Rhett Davies, it features contributions from a small core of musicians, including Robert Fripp (guitar), Phil Collins (drums), Percy Jones (fretless bass), and Rod Melvin (piano). John Cale (of The Velvet Underground) plays viola on two tracks.

The album marked a transition from the rock-based music of Eno's previous releases toward the minimalist instrumentals of his late 1970s ambient work. Only five of its fourteen tracks feature vocals. Employing tactics derived from his Oblique Strategies cards for guidance, Eno utilised a variety of unconventional recording techniques and instrumental approaches, reflected in unusual instrumental credits such as "snake guitar" and "uncertain piano". The cover is a detail from After Raphael by the British artist Tom Phillips.

The album’s only chart success was in New Zealand, where it reached #24, even though an international body of critics praised Another Green World upon its release. Contemporary reception has been likewise positive; several publications, including Rolling Stone, NME and Pitchfork, have named the album among the greatest of the 1970s.

Production 

Another Green World was recorded at Island Studios in London during the months of July and August 1975. Brian Eno originally viewed his new album as an experiment and entered the recording studio with nothing written or prepared beforehand. For the first four days in the studio, Eno failed to be productive. To look for new ideas, Eno turned to his instructional cards, the Oblique Strategies, and began coming up with new ideas as he did with his previous album Taking Tiger Mountain (By Strategy).

Some of the album credits for the instruments have fanciful names that describe the sound they make. The "Castanet Guitars" are electric guitars played with mallets and are electronically treated to sound something like castanets. The "Leslie piano" is an acoustic piano miked and fed through a Leslie speaker with a built-in revolving horn speaker. Eno described the "snake guitar" and "digital guitar" by stating "the kind of lines I was playing reminded me of the way a snake moves through the brush, a sort of speedy, forceful, liquid quality. Digital guitar is a guitar threaded through a digital delay but fed back on itself a lot so it makes this cardboard tube type of sound."

Like his previous two solo efforts, Eno had several guest musicians contributing to Another Green World. Unlike his previous albums, Eno worked on more solo material. Seven songs on the album have Eno playing all the instruments himself, including electronic and nonelectronic keyboards, guitars, and percussion. Among the guest musicians was Phil Collins, who played drums on Tiger Mountain and got along with Eno, which led to calling him and fellow Brand X bandmate Percy Jones to play on Another Green World. On recording the album, Collins recalled:
[Eno] gave us all a bit of paper, and we made lists from one to 15. Eno said "No. 2, we all play a G; No. 7 we all play a C sharp"; an so on. So it was like painting by numbers... [Eno] used to love me and Percy; we'd go in and run through our dictionary licks and he'd record them and make a loop of them.
Robert Fripp, who worked with Eno on (No Pussyfooting) and Here Come the Warm Jets, performed the solo on "St. Elmo's Fire". Eno asked Fripp to improvise a lightning-fast guitar solo that would imitate an electrical charge between two poles on a Wimshurst high-voltage generator. This was the basis for Eno crediting Fripp's solo on this track as "Wimshurst Guitar".

Music and lyrics
Another Green World represents a turning point in Eno's musical career. While his previous albums contained quirky rock songs, only five of the fourteen tracks on the album have lyrics. Critic Ian Wade of The Quietus noted that the album is "much calmer" than Eno's previous works, "with the avant smoothed into a new pastoral ambient pop and Eno singing on only five of its 14 tracks". Music critic Jim DeRogatis called it an "ambient/art-pop classic". According to eMusic's Richard Gehr, the album's music veers from the guitar-oriented experimental rock of Eno's 1974 albums Here Come the Warm Jets and Taking Tiger Mountain (By Strategy) to the synth-oriented ambient minimalism of his subsequent work. Its minimalist instrumentals are scattered among more structured art-rock songs. According to AllMusic's Steve Huey, most of the album has "paced instrumentals that, while often closer to ambient music than pop, are both melodic and rhythmic", and are accompanied by few pop songs, including "St. Elmo's Fire", "I'll Come Running", and "Golden Hours". The instrumental tracks explore a new kind of sound that is more quiet and restful, marking the change between Eno's earlier rock songs and his later instrumental works in which texture and timbre are the most important musical elements. Dave Simpson described the album as creating a "largely song-based electronic pop", while AllMusic's Jason Ankeny described it as an art rock album.

"Sky Saw" opens the album with the instruments constantly changing structure, except for one of the two bass parts which plays the same pattern throughout. Eno has re-used differently mixed instrumentations of "Sky Saw" for a track for Music for Films and a song for Ultravox's debut album which he would later produce. "Songs like 'The Big Ship, writes Mike Powell, "start on A and linger, accumulating countermelodies, magnifying themes, staying the same and yet revealing new sides with every turn." "In Dark Trees" and "The Big Ship" are two songs on which Eno plays all the instruments, namely the synthesizer, synthetic percussion and treated rhythm generator. The pulse of these songs is provided by the repeated rhythm coming from the rhythm box. These instrumental pieces and others like "Little Fishes" have been described as "highly imagistic, like paintings done in sound that actually resemble their titles".

To create the lyrics, Eno would later play the backing tracks singing nonsense syllables to himself, then taking them and forming them into actual words, phrases and meaning. This lyric-writing method was used for all his vocal-based recordings of the 1970s.
The tracks that do feature lyrics are in the same free-associative style as Eno's previous albums. The humour in the lyrics has been described as "less bizarre than gently whimsical and addled".

Release and reception

Another Green World was released in November 1975 and did not chart in either the United Kingdom or the United States. The album's critical reception was, however, for the most part very favourable. Henry Edwards of High Fidelity wrote positively of the album, claiming it to be Eno's "most accessible to date". Tom Hull of The Village Voice felt that, although it "wouldn't be fair to say that Another Green World is Eno's best album", the album is definitely "his easiest to love". Charley Walters of Rolling Stone found it a "major triumph" that Eno's creative risks "so consistently pan out", and said that it is "indeed an important record—and also a brilliant one". Negative reviews of the album focused on the lack of the rock songs from Eno's previous albums. Jon Pareles, writing in Crawdaddy!, found its electronic excursions less challenging than Eno's previous progressive rock songs and remarked: "This ain't no Eno record. I don't care what the credits say. It doesn't even get on my nerves." Lester Bangs of The Village Voice was lulled by much of the music and said that "those little pools of sound on the outskirts of silence seemed to me the logical consequence of letting the processes and technology share your conceptual burden". Robert Christgau, who originally gave the album an "A−" in his review for The Village Voice, admitted that he resisted the album at first, but ultimately grew to "love every minute of this arty little collection of static (i.e., non-swinging) synthesizer pieces (with vocals, percussion, and guitar)". In Christgau's Record Guide: Rock Albums of the Seventies (1981), he said that the record's 13 pieces can be appreciated both individually and as a whole, while calling it "the aural equivalent of a park on the moon – oneness with nature under conditions of artificial gravity". In 1977, Another Green World was voted the 11th best album of 1976 in The Village Voices Pazz & Jop critics' poll. Christgau, the poll's creator, ranked it second on his own list for the poll.

In 2004, Virgin Records began reissuing Eno's albums in remastered digipaks. Modern reception of Another Green World has been more unanimously positive. Steve Huey of AllMusic called the album "a universally acknowledged masterpiece" and "the perfect introduction to his achievements even for those who find ambient music difficult to enjoy". Mike Powell of Pitchfork hailed it as Eno's definitive album, and Q magazine wrote that it was "breathtakingly ahead of its time". J. D. Considine, writing in The Rolling Stone Album Guide (2004), said that Eno used the recording studio for the album "as an instrument, molding directed improvisations, electronic effects, and old-fashioned songcraft into perfectly balanced aural ecosystems". In his review for Blender, Douglas Wolk said that the audio clarity of the remastered edition "makes it easier to pay attention to every [song's] subtle complexities".

Legacy 

The album has made several top albums lists. Pitchfork placed the album at number ten on its list of greatest albums of the 1970s. In 2012, Rolling Stone ranked the album number 429 on its list of the 500 greatest albums of all time, and then at number 338 in the updated 2020 list. In 2003, Blender placed the album on its list of "500 CDs You Must Own: Alternative Rock", stating that the album is "Experimental yet accessible, it’s exactly the kind of album that Eno devotees long for from him today".

An extract from the title track was used as the theme music for BBC Two television's arts series Arena.

Accolades
The information regarding lists including Another Green World is adapted from Acclaimed Music, except where otherwise noted.

Track listing

Personnel 
Credits adapted from Another Green World back cover.

"Sky Saw"
 Phil Collins – drums
 Percy Jones – fretless bass
 Paul Rudolph – anchor bass
 Rod Melvin – Rhodes piano
 John Cale – viola section
 Eno – snake guitar, digital guitar, vocals

"Over Fire Island"
 Phil Collins – drums
 Percy Jones – fretless bass
 Brian Eno – vocals, synthesizer, guitars, tapes

"St. Elmo's Fire"
 Robert Fripp – Wimshurst guitar
 Brian Eno – organ, piano, Yamaha bass pedals, synthetic percussion, desert guitars, vocals

"In Dark Trees"
 Brian Eno – guitars, synthesizer, electric percussion and treated rhythm generator

"The Big Ship"
 Brian Eno – synthesizer, synthetic percussion and treated rhythm generator

"I'll Come Running"
 Robert Fripp – restrained lead guitar
 Paul Rudolph – bass, snare drums, bass guitar, assistant castanet guitars
 Rod Melvin – lead piano
 Brian Eno – vocals, castanet guitars, chord piano, synthesizer, synthetic percussion

"Another Green World"
 Brian Eno – desert guitars, Farfisa organ, piano

"Sombre Reptiles"
 Brian Eno – Hammond organ, guitars, synthetic and Peruvian percussion, electric elements and unnatural sounds

"Little Fishes"
 Brian Eno – prepared piano, Farfisa organ

"Golden Hours"
 Robert Fripp – Wimborne guitar
 John Cale – viola
 Brian Eno – choppy organs, spasmodic percussion, club guitars, uncertain piano, vocals

"Becalmed"
 Brian Eno – Leslie piano, synthesizer

"Zawinul/Lava"
 Phil Collins – percussion
 Percy Jones – fretless bass
 Paul Rudolph – guitar
 Rod Melvin – Rhodes piano
 Brian Eno – grand piano, synthesizer, organ and tape
 
"Everything Merges with the Night"
 Brian Turrington – bass guitar, pianos
 Brian Eno – guitars, vocals

"Spirits Drifting"
 Brian Eno – bass guitar, organ, synthesizer  

Production
 Brian Eno – production 
 Rhett Davies – production, engineering
 Guy Bidmead – engineering assistance
 Barry Sage – engineering assistance
 Robert Ash – engineering assistance
 Bob Bowkett – sleeve typography
 Ritva Saarikko – back cover photography 
 Tom Phillips – cover art (detail from After Raphael)

Charts

See also 

 1975 in music
 British rock
 Music of the United Kingdom (1970s)

References 

Works cited

External links 

Another Green World (Adobe Flash) at Radio3Net (streamed copy where licensed)
 

1975 albums
Brian Eno albums
Albums produced by Brian Eno
Albums produced by Rhett Davies
Island Records albums
Art pop albums
Ambient albums by English artists
Art rock albums by English artists
Avant-pop albums
Electropop albums
Works for prepared piano